Turks and Caicos Islands competed at the 2022 World Aquatics Championships in Budapest, Hungary from 18 June to 3 July. This is the Turks and Caicos Islands' first appearance at the FINA World Aquatics Championships.

Swimming

A swimmer from Turks and Caicos Islands, Rohan Karim Shearer, achieved qualifying standards in the following events.

References

Nations at the 2022 World Aquatics Championships
2022 in the Turks and Caicos Islands
Turks and Caicos Islands at the World Aquatics Championships